The 2014–15 Kia Carnival season was the first season of the franchise in the Philippine Basketball Association (PBA). The team was known as Kia Sorento for the Philippine Cup.

Key dates
June 9: Manny Pacquiao was officially named the head coach of Kia.
July 18: The 2014 PBA Expansion Draft took place in Microtel Acropolis, in Libis, Quezon City.
August 24: The 2014 PBA Draft will take place in Midtown Atrium, Robinson Place Manila. On the same day, Columbian Autocar Corporation president Gina Domingo announced that they took the moniker "Sorento", the name of their top-selling sports utility vehicle in the Philippines and United States.
January 23: The team changed their moniker to Kia Carnival for the Commissioner's Cup.

Expansion draft picks

Draft picks

Roster

Philippine Cup

Eliminations

Standings

Game log

Playoffs

Bracket

Commissioner's Cup

Eliminations

Standings

Game log

Playoffs

Bracket

Transactions

Trades

Philippine Cup

Recruited imports

(* Asian import)

References

2014–15
Kia